One Evening After the War is a 1998 Cambodian drama film, directed and co-written by Rithy Panh. Panh directed this neo-realist French-Cambodian social drama set amid Southeast Asian poverty and the Cambodian underworld.

The film premiered in the Un Certain Regard section at the 1998 Cannes Film Festival.

Cast 

 Chea Lyda Chan as Srey Poeuv
 Narith Roeun as Savannah
 Peng Phan as Srey Poeuv's mother
 Ratha Keo as Maly
 Srangath Kheav as Mute child
 Mol Sovannak as Phal

Release
One Evening After the War made its world premiere in the Un Certain Regard section at the 1998 Cannes Film Festival. It opened for general release in France on December 16, 1998.

References

External links

 

1998 films
1990s crime drama films
Cambodian drama films
Khmer-language films
French crime drama films
Films directed by Rithy Panh
1998 drama films
1990s French films